Guilin University of Aerospace Technology (GUAT) is a public university in Guilin, Guangxi, China.

GUAT offers Bachelor's degrees and higher education diplomas in engineering and technology, as well as management, business and arts. 

GUAT was founded in 1979 and run by the former Aerospace Ministry of China, and has over 10,000 students.

Departments
 School of Management 
 School of Aerospace Tourism
 School of Mechanical Engineering
 School of Electronic and Automation Engineering
 School of Auto and Transport Engineering
 School of Energy, Architecture and Environment
 Department of Computer Science and Engineering
 Department of Foreign Language and Trade
 Department of Media and Art Design

Undergraduate courses
 BA. Accounting
 BA. Administrative Management
 BA. Advertising
 BA. Animation
 BA. Art Design
 BA. Business Management
 BA. E-Commerce
 BA. English Language
 BA. Human Resources Management
 BA. Information Management and Information Systems
 BA. Japanese Language
 BA. Marketing
 BA. Project Management
 BA. Tourism Management
 BEc. International Trade and Economics
 BEng. Architecture
 BEng. Automation
 BEng. Bio-engineering
 BEng. Chemical Engineering and Technology
 BEng. Civil Engineering
 BEng. Communications Engineering
 BEng. Computer Science and Technology
 BEng. Electronic Information Engineering
 BEng. Environmental Engineering
 BEng. Hydrographic and Resources Engineering
 BEng. Industrial Design
 BEng. Inorganic and Non-metallic Materials Engineering
 BEng. Jewelry and Materials Technology
 BEng. Macromolecular Materials and Engineering
 BEng. Mechanic Manufacture & Automation
 BEng. Prospecting and Engineering
 BEng. Resource Exploration Engineering
 BEng. Survey Engineering
 BEng. Urban Planning
 BEng. Water Supply and Drainage Engineering
 BSc. Applied Chemistry
 BSc. Applied Physics
 BSc. Electronic Information Science and Technology
 BSc. Environmental Science
 BSc. Forestry Resources Protection and Leisure
 BSc. Geographic Information Systems
 BSc. Geology
 BSc. Geophysics
 BSc. Information and Computing Science
 BSc. Materials Chemistry
 BSc. Resources Environment and Urban and Regional Planning Management
 BSc. Statistics
 LLB. Social Work

References

Universities and colleges in Guilin
Educational institutions established in 1979